Respublika–Ata Zhurt (sometimes spelled as Respublika–Ata Jurt) was a Kyrgyz political party that was created after the merger of the Respublika and Ata-Zhurt parties in 2014. However, the two parties ended up splitting apart again in 2020.

Ideology
The main goal of the political party is the development of liberalism through reforms aimed at increasing democracy in the country and greater transparency of the bureaucracy.The "Respublika" and "Ata-Zhurt" parties have united into one in the name of stability and prosperity of the country, — Kamchybek Tashiev at the extraordinary congress of the "Respublika — Ata-Zhurt" party.

References

External links
Official website

Defunct political parties in Kyrgyzstan
2014 establishments in Kyrgyzstan
Political parties established in 2014
Liberal parties
Political parties disestablished in 2020
2020 disestablishments in Asia